Hyponerita similis is a moth of the subfamily Arctiinae first described by Walter Rothschild in 1909. It is found in French Guiana, Suriname, Guyana, Amazonas, Venezuela, Ecuador and Peru.

References

Moths described in 1909
Phaegopterina